Jake Ransom and the Skull King's Shadow is a young adult novel by James Rollins, part of the Jake Ransom fantasy adventure series.

Plot synopsis
When a mysterious envelope arrives for Jake Ransom, he and his older sister, Kady, are plunged into a gripping chain of events. An artifact found by their parents (on the expedition from which they never returned) leads Jake and Kady to a strange world inhabited by a peculiar mix of long-lost civilizations such as the Romans, Mayans, and the Dinosaurs, a world that may hold the key to their parents disappearance.

But even as they enter the gate to this extraordinary place, savage creatures soar across the sky, diving to attack. Jake's new friends, the Mayan girl Marika and the Roman Pindor, say the creatures were created by an evil alchemist - the Skull King, Kalverum Rex. as Jake struggles to find a way home, it becomes  obvious that what the Skull King wants most is Jake and Kady - dead or alive. Will Jake stay and help his friends or will he turn his back on his new friends?

Characters
Jake Ransom
Kady Ransom
Marika Balam
Pindor Tiberius
Bach'uuk
Henry Bethel
Huntress Livia
Kalverum Rex a.k.a. The Skull King
Centurion Gaius
Magister Balam
Magister Oswin
Magister Zahur
Morgan Drummond
Heronidus Tiberius
Marcus Tiberius
Astrid Ulfsdottir
Elder Wu
Mer'uuk
Jake and Kady's parents 
Museum Curator
Randy White
Craig Brask
John Harry

Sequel (s)
 Jake Ransom and the Howling Sphinx

Novels by James Rollins
Young adult fantasy novels
American young adult novels
2009 American novels